Lester B. Pearson School for the Arts is a public, elementary - Grades 4 to 8, school in London, Ontario, Canada, part of the Thames Valley District School Board. Most students begin in the Grade 4 year, though there are occasional openings in other grades.

Academics
The academic program is based on the Ministry of Education (Ontario) curriculum. Teachers are fully qualified members of the Ontario College of Teachers. Identified gifted students participate in the TVDSB Itinerant Gifted Program. Extracurricular sports include Volleyball, Basketball, Cross Country, and Track & Field.

Arts curriculum

Dance
Students have dance class several times a week in studios with sprung wood floors. Dances go from ballet to hip-hop to swing, with emphasis on collaboration, expression and technique.

Drama
At Pearson, there are different shows going on throughout the year. The Grade 4 students do a small performance that is usually composed of a number of skits. The Grade 5 students do a play that is based on the historical curriculum on First Nations. In the past years the Grade 6s have done many performances including: "Number the Stars", "A Midsummer Night's Dream", "Ready Steady Go", "Clowns", and "How to Eat like a Child", and the beloved "A Christmas Carol". The Grade 7s spend most of the year doing drama units including Voice Unit, Improvisation, Character Unit, Stage Combat, Design Unit, and sometimes a staged weapons unit, but the Grade 7s do not actually produce a show. The Grade 8s do two shows. They always produce a Shakespearean Play, and an original play that they write, design, and perform themselves.

Music
Three components: Vocal, Keyboard, and an Instrument.

Each grade has Single Vocal where you learn theory and music history, and Double Vocal where both the classes in a grade learn to sing together as a choir and develop individual choral technique. The Pearson Singers, an auditioned SAT choir of approximately 70 in Grades 5–8, rehearses twice a week in the early morning.  The Singers have toured Carnegie Hall, Canterbury Cathedral, Chicago, and New Brunswick. The "Twelve" is an SATB group of approximately 12–18 Grade 8 students who perform more complex pieces with more solo work. At the end of the year the whole school does a massive Choral Celebration at H.B. Beal Secondary School.

Every student receives instruction on the keyboard. Grade 4s are introduced to recorder and piano. Beginning in Grade 5, each student trains on either a string or wind instrument and performs numerous concerts with that instrument all the way through Grade 8.

The Stage Band is a special winds group consisting of only saxophones, trombones and trumpets that play jazz music and tour around the city.

Visual art
Subjects include Art History, Drawing, Painting, Stained Glass(Grade 8), Ceramics, Design & Colour Theory.

Other
The school has a workshop, used to build and store props and sets for plays.
In the winter after New Year's Day the whole school goes on a ski trip at Boler Mountain. At year end, Grades 4, 5 and 7 go to East Park for a day. Grade 6 goes to Camp Kawartha, Grade 7 to Canada's Wonderland and Grade 8 to Quebec City.

Summer arts camp

Each year a series of two-week summer arts camps are offered at the school, with Pearson teachers or other TVDSB art specialist teachers.

Notable alumni

Though Pearson is not a performing arts school, some graduates have gone on to performing or arts-related careers.
Trevor Blumas, actor
Rebecca Liddiard, actor
Sydney Meyer, actor
Luke Macfarlane, actor
Sam Maggs, author
Amber Marshall, actor
Meaghan Smith, singer

References
Pearson website
Pearson Celebrates 20 Years

External links
Pearson website
School Board website

Elementary schools in London, Ontario